This is a characters list of Japanese manga and anime series Crayon Shin-chan created by Yoshito Usui.

Nohara family

 (野原新之助)
Age: 5 (First appearance) - 6 (Currently)

He is the main character, son of Hiroshi and Misae. His nickname is "Shin-chan" Nohara and he is Himawari's brother, a kindergarten-aged boy whose antics are the basis for the series. He is often involved in a running gag of pulling down his pants to reveal his buttocks and dance in the process with an accompanying original song (known as "Ass dance" in the Funimation English dub). His affectionate name by relatives is Shin-chan. He is five years old and loves chocolate biscuits of the brand "Chocobi" and a TV superhero named "Action Mask", but he absolutely hates green peppers (acute lachanophobia). He always takes care of his sister, Himawari. He inherited more genes from his mother than his father. He is lethargic, loves to eat and sleep, stingy, stubborn, imagining things, cannot resist good things, opinionated and brazen which is just like his mother while the only thing same with his father is likes to watch and flirt pretty young ladies. Both Shin-chan and his sister's appearance look more like their mother (though Shin-chan's trademark thick eyebrows do seem to a pattern from his father's side). He is a very enthusiastic singer and pretty good baseball and football player. He learned photography from his aunt Musae. Sometimes he changes the actual words, making it very funny. For example, promise becomes promotion etc. He often exhibits deep affection for his best friend, Kazama. Some of his strange activities include dressing up (often as an animal). He also causes trouble for others and then criticizes their efforts in covering for him. In general, he is outspoken and very curious. He has little to no shame. In several occasions, both in manga and anime, he is either seen doing drag or wearing animal costumes. There have been several instances in which his antics actually solved the problems of those around him. He also displays a surprising amount of talent at changing the wordings of songs that he sings. On rare occasions, he displays bouts of selfless kindness; For example, in one anime episode he saved a frog from a truck on a rainy day, becoming wet and dirty in the process and risking Misae's ire since it was his last set of clean clothes. In another episode, he gives Masao the change he had even though he knows that his mother will scold him later. A running gag in the series involves Shin-chan being late for the bus to his school, usually due to taking a long time in the bathroom, leading Misae to begrudgingly having to take him to school on her bike. Although he always tease his mother, he is very close to his mother. There are also times when Shin-chan displays a level of maturity beyond his usual self in his concern for others, and in a few rare instances he shows that deep down he really does care for his family,regardless of how much distress he may sometimes cause them. He is also a member of the Kasukabe Defence Force.
He is known as Shin-chan Nohara in the Vitello, Phuuz and Funimation dubs, and the jokes he makes in the Funimation dub are more adult.

Julian Ryall referred to him as the "Japanese Bart Simpson".

Misae Nohara

She is Shin-chan's mother from Kyushu. She is 29 and a typical housewife  of post-war Japan: She cleans, launders, cooks, sews, mothers Shin-chan and his sister, and lazes. She is a tough and strong woman. While at heart a caring and nurturing individual, her positive aspects are often offset by her many shortcomings. A paragon of hypocrisy, after handing out irrevocable edicts to her husband and children, she will not hesitate to immediately break them once they are out of sight. Her famous and symbolic moves includes "drilling" others' head with her fists (known as "guri-guri") and a series of punches on the head, creating comically large lumps (the punches are mainly thrown by Misae, but other characters have been known to use it as well, such as Hiroshi and even Nene). Her son often makes fun of her habitual constipation, as well as her fluctuating weight and small breasts. While she spends as little as possible on the less-essential needs of her husband and son, she loves to splurge on Himawari and herself, though she is noted to have instances of great generosity. She always changes her hairstyles as seen it is sometimes curly and sometimes long and shattered hair. Most of her luxury purchases, however, often end up broken, misused or otherwise ruined by her children, sometimes even before she had a chance to try them. She is the source of boundless diet and savings plans, all of which fail within the first week or even first day. She is prone to immediately partake in bargain sales when she sees them, thinking she is saving the family money. She then buys extreme quantities, regardless of the practicality, which defeats the purpose. Additionally she secretly hoards money for her own personal use. She is also known to be a terrible driver. Misae also constantly checks Shin-chan's and Hiroshi's behavior around young women and punishes them accordingly (and always seems to be in the right place at the right time when it comes to the latter). She constantly force Shin-chan to eat green peppers, either unaware or intentionally ignorant of his lachanophobia. She was born in Aso, Kumamoto.
She is known as Mitsy Nohara in the Vitello and Phuuz dubs.
She is known as Mitzi Nohara in the Funimation dub. A recurring joke in the dub revolves around her stashing away money into her "boob job jar" to save up for breast implants.
She is known as Mitsi Nohara in the Indian dubbed version.

Hiroshi Nohara

He is Shin-chan's father from Akita in Northern Japan, and is the sole source of income. Also known as Harry, he is a loving father to his two children, and ultimately a devoted husband. While he is the family bread-winner, he hands the reins of finance over to his wife, who maintains a totalitarian level of control on family spending. At age 35, he is a stereotypical Japanese salaryman, working eight-hour days, enduring overstuffed trains, enjoying the occasional nightlife, and giving every bit of his take home pay to his wife every month. While his relationship with his family is positive on the whole, there is an abundance of recurring conflict. He and his wife bicker on many different things, from how little he gets for spending money every month, to whose turn it is to give the baby a bath. Misae is also notorious for inflicting violence on Hiroshi whenever she gets very angry (usually when his gaze wanders to younger women). He often dreams about being a playboy while he sleeps as an escape, though this is usually interrupted by some external stimulation. He enjoys a playful relationship with his children; but sometimes they're the source of his problems. He loves a cold beer after work and shares Shin-chan's appreciation of TV shows with young women in skimpy clothing, often becoming too excited about it for Misae's liking. He will not hesitate to save his allowance for things he wants, but can be seen spending much of it on things for family. He too hoards money for his own personal use. A running joke is made of the pungent odor of his feet and his socks are often used as weapons by other members of the family. The bad smell of his feet is also used sometimes during an emergency to help them escape. He was born in Omagari, Akita (a village in Daisen, Akita) and graduated from Waseda University.
He is known as Harry Nohara in the Vitello and Phuuz dubs.
He is known as Hiro Nohara in the Funimation dub.

Himawari Nohara

She is Shin-chan's sister and the youngest child of the Nohara family, born in 1996. She is an energetic, precocious and vibrant infant. While technically newborn, her character has matured and grown more intelligent during her stay in the series, being able to discern a real jewel from a simple piece of imitation (and throwing away the latter). She possesses a palpable lust for shiny objects (jewels and precious metals) and brand-name goods. She emulates her mother in her utterly stubborn pursuit of handsome young men who catch her eye, not unlike her brother, who soon discovered that a way to pacify her was to put on a cutout mask of a known handsome actor. In her family, she is an icon of adoration and annoyance, causing trouble she cannot be blamed for given her infantile innocence. She is an extremely fast crawler, tiring out even Shin-chan, and often uses Shiro as a toy. She looks up to her brother a lot, and is very close to him, although they occasionally fight. Her name, which is Japanese for "sunflower", was chosen by the show's viewership and not the creator. It is also hinted that she might marry Kazama Toru in the future.
She is known as Daisy Nohara in the Vitello and Phuuz dubs.
 
 
She is known as Hima Nohara in the Funimation dub.

Shiro

 is a white, fluffy pup Shin-chan found in a cardboard box early in the series. While a beloved member of the family, he is the subject of neglect thanks to his owner's forgetfulness and short attention-span. He is a very intelligent dog, often presenting logic and intellect that surpasses his human owners. As his meals from the Nohara's are at best inconsistent, he has developed a talent for foraging, though other times he has to eat Misae's failed culinary experiments. An oddly human-like dog, he is very responsible and painstakingly careful. He takes care of his owners diligently, though often they do not realize his help or understand what he is trying to show them. His doghouse also often ends up becoming a place for Shin-chan to hide himself or something he doesn't want his family to find. He often plays protector to Himawari, more often than not sacrificing his well being in the process.
He is known as Lucky in the Vitello and Phuuz dubs.
He is known as Whitey in the Funimation dub, and he has an added British voice over. It is mentioned that he had a brother named "Blackey" that was also owned by Shin's family who was hit by a car.
He is known as Whitey in the LUK International dub.

Hiroshi's 65-year-old father, Shin-chan and Himawari's paternal grandfather. Like his son and his grandson, Shin-chan, he enjoys looking at and flirting with pretty young women. He also likes to do weird things with his grandson and taught him many of his habits. He is affectionately called Gin-chan. When he visits the Nohara's, he always stays for much longer than Misae would like, leading to friction between the two. He greets the family in various strange (and often embarrassing) ways whenever they visit Akita, such as dressing as various movie characters. Another running gag in the series is that he suddenly appears in Kasukabe out of nowhere.
In the Funimation dub, he is affectionately called "Gin" and "roamed" the countryside on a motorcycle when he was younger.
He is known as Gary in the Vitello and Phuuz dubs.

Hiroshi's 62-year-old mother, Shin-chan and Himawari's paternal grandmother. Although she seems to be more mature than her husband, she acts more strangely in front of Shin-chan and Himawari. One of her most shameless act is the “saggy hag's belly dance” which Shin-chan once asked if “they can be tied into a knot?”

Hiroshi's 40-year-old brother, Shin-chan and Himawari's uncle. He works as a farmer, he's not very smart and rarely expresses any emotions. In the manga he's known to be extremely stingy.

Koyama family

Misae's 63-year-old father and Shin-chan and Himawari's maternal grandfather. As a retired teacher, he has much higher standards of public decorum than Hiroshi's father Ginnosuke. This results in him constantly arguing with Ginnosuke. Although he is stubborn (a trait that passed to his daughters and grandson.) and conservative, he is actually a caring person.  He likes his grandson. He is occasionally childish and argues with his wife about very minor things, often resulting in him and Ginnosuke going to the Noharas.
He is known as Waldo in the Vitello and Phuuz dubs.
He is known as Yoshi Koyama in the Funimation dub.
He is known as Yoshio Koyama in the Indian Dub.

Misae's 58-year-old mother and Shin-chan and Himawari's maternal grandmother. Her appearances in Shin-chan episodes are usually with her husband. Like her husband, she looks down on the way Hiroshi's father behaves, but she gets along well with Ginnosuke's wife Tsuru. She always fights over little things with her husband Yoshiji.
In the Funimation dub, she is referenced as repeatedly having threatened to kill herself in the past, frequently stating "this makes me think twice about suicide" as a reaction to various things.

Misae's 35-year-old older sister as well as Shin-Chan and Himawari's older aunt . She is a spinster who works at the same middle school her father used to work as a Japanese literature teacher. Her appearances on the show are rare. She usually appears as an elegant and well spoken kimono wearing lady, yet as a sharp contrast to her elegant image, she unexpectedly shares some of the same mischievous antics as Shin-chan and Ginnosuke (such as putting on a werewolf's mask upon entering Nohara's house as a prank or singing song making fun of Misae's body with Shin-chan), though it is possible that Misae learned some of her moves from her.
She is known as Minnie in the Vitello and Phuuz dubs.

Misae's 26-year-old younger sister and Shin-chan and Himawari's aunt. She is also a spinster and is very lazy and likes to eat snacks  and sleep all the time. She dreams of becoming a photographer and her wish fulfills. She often makes a mess in the room she lives in. Compared to her sisters, she is more childlike hence she connects well with local kids.
Shinchan call her as "Masi"(maternal aunt) in Indian dub and She is known as "Bitzi Koyama" in the Funimation dub, and is stated to be a "Brown-brown" addict.

Futaba Kindergarten

In the Japanese anime, the school is called . In the Funimation dub, it is renamed to Super Happy Fun Time American School. Funimation head writer Jared Hedges states that the Americanization of the school was done to use the characters as an outlet for American humor and references while keeping the show location in Japan.

Sunflower Class

An "organization" that Shin-chan and his best friends created as a group in the episode 143 "Kasukabe Defence Force". The purpose of this group was to promote peace in Kasukabe, but they hardly do anything meaningful during their operations, ironically causing many troubles when they do "defend". They also protect Kasukabe and the world. Their secret base is located at teacher Yoshinaga's room and the buildings stairs. They usually bicker and fight about who is going to be leader.
It is known as the Kazhukids in the Vitello and Phuuz dubs, as Kasukabe is called Kazhu in these dubs.
It is known as the Kasukabe Army in the Spanish and Portuguese dubs.

Toru Kazama

Tōru Kazama is Shin-chan's  immaculately groomed and perfectly mannered friend, who usually loses his mind when Shin-chan teases him among other things. He also bickers and fights with Shin-chan sometimes. Despite that, they are actually closer than any of the other friends they have. A strong evidence of this was when Kazama was extremely frustrated and lonely in several episodes, Shin-chan was the only one who stayed with him. Even though Kazama always denies when Shin-chan says that he is his most best friend, his best friend is Shin-chan too. Of all of Shin-chan's friends, he's the only one referred to by his family name (Kazama-kun). Only his mother uses his given name (Tōru-chan). He participates in extracurricular activities like English Conversation and seems knowledgeable in any subject (even if he is not), which makes him appear as snobbish, but he is actually a good person. He plays association football and baseball very well. He likes female animation and comic book characters, though he tries to hide that fact from his friends. He also has a strong attachment to his mother. A recurring theme in the show is that he tries to hang out with upper class girls his age to be a part of the "elite", but runs into Shin-chan being weird which ultimately causes the girl to lose interest in hanging out with him. He likes a girl from his tuition classes. It is hinted that Kazama might marry Himawari in the future.
He is known as Cosmo in the Vitello and Phuuz dubs.
He is known as Georgie Herbert Walker Prescott III in the Funimation dub and is changed into an ultra-conservative Republican American. In the third season, it is stated that his family lost most of their money due to the economic recession, though he attempts to hide this from his peers.
 " Nene Chan"

Age: 5 (First appearance), 6 (Current)
Nene Sakurada (Nene-chan) is Shin-chan's female classmate and the only one female best friend. She has a crush on Shin-chan (usually not obvious). Her nickname is Nene-chan. She loves to play 'real omamagoto', or 'real house', in which divorces and arguments are very common and she typically forces/blackmails her four boy best friends to play with her. This is always a nuisance to Shin-chan, Bo-chan, and Kazama-kun and a nightmare to Masao as he often needs to be Nene's husband (unsuccessful salaryman) in the plot. However, she loves her friends very much and stands up for them without any hesitation. She occasionally sees her mother go crazy or do something out of character (usually it's because Shin-chan drives her crazy) and shrieks something which is literally translated to be "You're not my usual mom!" Nene styles herself as a sweet girl, but in fact she has inherited her mother's temper and is quite bossy. Like her mother, she hits a stuffed bunny to relieve her anger. She considers Ai her rival. She is the only female member of the Kasukabe Defence Force, and takes it very seriously. Despite her many flaws, she is a tough, headstrong and kind hearted little girl.  
She is known as Nini in the Vitello and Phuuz dubs, but as Penny in the Funimation dub.
In the LUK Internacional dub she has a British accent.

Age: 5 (First appearance), 6 (Current)
Masao Sato is a well-behaved but timid boy, often cry out of fright. Shin-chan and Nene sometimes tease him but not in a bad way. Nene is often annoyed by his cowardice, and encourages him to stand up for himself. Shin-chan and Nene often scold him (the former is usually a display of humor and the latter are usually annoyed) and make him cry while Kazama and Bo calm him down and comforted him. Even so, he is often shown to have a rebellious side when he gets driven. His nickname is "Onigiri" due to his shaven head's resemblance to a rice ball, and there are several moments where Shin-chan accidentally mistook Masao's head for rice ball and even try to eat it. The people that bully him use it as a put-down. He seems to have a very low self esteem. He is a gifted artist whose hobby is to write and illustrate comics.He is also quite knowledgable and creative. Masao is in love with Ai and jealous at Shin-chan because Ai loves Shin-chan but they are still best friends. 
He is known as Max in the Vitello and Phuuz dubs.
He is known as Maso Sato in the Funimation dub. The Funimation website says that Maso is like "Linus without his blanket." The dub features a running joke implying that Maso is gay, due to his timid and occasionally effeminate nature.
 " Bo - Chan"

Age: 5 (First appearance), 6 (Current)
Another of Shin-chan's best friends Bo - Chan, he seems slow and expressionless, but is actually quite smart and has an interest in artistic, adult-oriented things. He loves to collect various kinds of stone and investigating urban legends and various mysterious objects such as UFOs. He often surprises his best friends with his insight, though he speaks quite slowly. He has a sister named Nisu-chan. He always has a trail of mucus running down his nose and can perform various tricks with it.
He is known as Boo in the Funimation dub, and he says he never wipes it away because he thinks that his snot is the source of his "power". He is portrayed as a stupid kid who often says nonsensical things like a sufferer from Tourette syndrome. For example, when Penny asked why someone would call Shin's ramshackle apartment "Falling Apartments", Boo responded by saying "I'd call it Boo eats soda and likes lamps." He likes to collect pet rocks, his favorite one is named "Phillip." The Funimation website says that Boo is "sort of like Dim from A Clockwork Orange, or Eeyore from Winnie the Pooh,- without the depression."
 " Ai- Chan"
Age: 5 (First appearance), 6 (Current)

Ai-chan is one of the show's newer characters. She appeared for the first time in episode 339-1. She is from a rich family and happened to be enrolled into the Futaba Kindergarten after she threw a dart at a map of Japan and hit Kasukabe to determine where she would go next. She is always seen riding in a black limousine and with a bodyguard. She is very manipulative and purposely bends people to her will just because she can. For example, she made many boys at Futaba Kindergarten fall in love with her. However, when she tried to do the same to Shin-chan, she failed. Because of that, she fell in love with Shin-chan and being the manipulator she is, uses his weaknesses (Action Mask, Chocobi, etc.) to get him to notice her. Masao likes her very much, but Ai almost never pays attention to him. When she does pay attention to him, she makes him act as her pet. She is also a fierce rival of Nene and they are always seen fighting over petty things.  She is not a part of the Kasukabe Defence Force. After kindergarten, she permanently moves to Hokkaido and is hence not shown in further episodes. She comes sometimes to meet them. In later episodes, it is shown that she has a younger brother called Kawaguchi Suotome.
She is known as Sally in the Phuuz dub.

Rose Class
The Rose Class is a class handled by Ume Matsuzaka. A recurring theme in the show is that the Rose Class is always in competition with the Sunflower Class in activities such as baseball, soccer, trekking, etc. Another recurring joke about the Rose Class is that whenever they have a competition, they would always reveal a member of the class with exceptional talent in that field. However, they are still beaten most of the time when competing with the Sunflower Class because of Shin Chan and his friends.

Yasuo is always wearing a leopard shirt and playing with his soccer ball, hence his nickname "Cheetah",  but Shinnosuke kept referring to him wrongly by random words that sound partially similar, much to his dismay, and thus constitute a running gag. He has a fierce dislike of Shinnosuke and Kazama and usually gets into shouting matches, fights and bickerings with the both of them.  He also loves to bully Masao. Even though he is confident in his athletic ability and acts as the Rose Class' leader, he almost always loses to the Sunflower Class because of Shin Chan and his friends. He has formed a clique with classmates Hitoshi and Terunobu. Even though sometimes he seems bad and snobbish, he also has a good heart on occasion. For example, when Shin-chan asked him to join the group and make something for Masao who is at the hospital, he agrees to do so because he is touched by their friendship. Furthermore, when Kasukabe Defence Force announced that they are going to 'disband', he is the first to cry and cheers for them, although the ending of the episode is unexpected.

This child is a kindergarten bully and always likes to bully Masao with Terunobu.
In the Funimation dub, he is unnamed, and is portrayed as a second-grader instead of a kindergartner.

This child is a kindergarten bully and always likes to bully Masao with Hitoshi. His dialogue usually consists of him just repeating the last thing Hitoshi says when they are bullying someone.
Like Hitoshi, the Funimation dub does not give him a name, and he is portrayed as a second-grader.

Kindergarten staff and relatives
 / MRS. ISHIZAKA

Shin-chan's 24-year-old class teacher. She has a rivalry with Ume Matsuzaka, and they get into arguments and bickerings over many things. However she takes care and protect Matsuzaka in certain critical situations. "Yoshinaga" is her maiden name. Her last name changed to "Ishizaka" after marrying Junichi Ishizaka on July 7, 2000. 
She is known as Miss Dori Snell in the Vitello and Phuuz dubs.
She is known as Miss Anderson in the Funimation dub.

Midori's 26-year-old husband. A nice, easy going man who gets along fine with Shin-chan and his friends and they in turn, like him as well. He has been portrayed as someone with a lack of confidence problem. This is true when he wanted to propose to Midori.
He is known as Ricky in the Vitello and Phuuz dubs.
He is known as Doyle in the Funimation dub. He is portrayed as a closet telepath and popcorn salesman. In season 3, he was in federal prison for popping an army colonel in his man-sized popcorn machine (which his wife claims was an accident). He struggles with embarrassingly large amounts of night flatulence, and the fact that his telepathy has weakened after mistakenly sticking his finger into an electrical socket.

Midori and Junichi's daughter. She does not appear in the anime.

Arch-rival of Miss Yoshinaga, teacher of the Rose class. Age 24. Single. Likes to live stylishly in public but she actually struggles to save her money for luxuries and lives in a very cheap, dusty apartment. She dislikes her given name as she always says to Yoshinaga and others, "Don't call me Ume!". This is due to one of the meanings of "Ume", which can mean "3rd class" or "low class".  Although she said before she is "tired of Futaba Kindergarten (especially Shin-chan and friends plus low salary despite all the hard work)" and plans to move out to a better school, she never seriously intends to do it. She supports and love the kindergarten too. Despite her rivalry and bickering with Midori, she cares for her and helped her reconcile with her future husband. A running gag about her is that her dates are often screwed up by Shin-chan and friends in various ways, until she meets Tokurou. Once she dated Hiroshi Nohara's co-worker Kawaguchi.
She is known as Miss Uma in the Vitello and Phuuz dubs.
She is known as Rachel Katz in the Funimation dub. She is portrayed as having not dated anyone for a long time, and is shown to be rather bitter towards Miss Anderson's relationship with Doyle due to this. In the third season her first name is mentioned as being "Rebecca" instead of "Rachel".  She is also a very strong figure.  When she ran into Roberto, afraid that the dress would be torn when he saw it, she performed a backflip.  She can also land on the steel pipe with high heels.  This is very rare for a character because not all teachers in the Kindergarten can do a flip with a dress.  This shows that Matsuzaka is not just a sassy-stylish kind of person, but an agile, strong woman because of her attending dance classes.

Ume's eldest sister. Age 28. Like her sister, she is also seeking for a man to form a relationship and eventually marry. Often, when news comes of Ume going on a date or participating in a matchmaking ceremony, Matsu and her other sister, Take, would interfere to win that man's affections, leading to the three sisters fighting over him, and it eventually ends with the man she is interested in escaping from the sisters. A similar situation transpired when Ume started dating Tokurou.

Ume's second eldest sister. Age 26. She often appears alongside her elder sister, Matsu, to fight over Ume's new boyfriend. In contrast to Matsu's traditional Japanese-style attire, Take is often prone to Western gaudiness.

Ume Matsuzaka's 28-year-old boyfriend. Worked as a chiropractor and archeologist. He is very enthusiastic about any type of bones ranging from ordinary chicken bones to exotic dinosaur bones. He and Ume met when she broke her leg and was admitted to the hospital he worked at. However, he died in an explosion in Africa when he was on an expedition with his professor, though this only happened in the manga; however, he no longer appears in the anime as well.

Teacher who handles the Cherry Blossom (Sakura) class. Age 22. She first appeared on July 10, 1998 as a new teacher. She seems to be nervous of everything and experiences panic attacks when facing a large group of kids (which is an everyday scenario of her). However, when Shin-chan takes off her glasses, her vision becomes blurred and a personality change takes place; she becomes very aggressive and fearless as shown in her first appearance in episode 281-2 . Her condition is somewhat similar to Lunch from the Dragon Ball series. She has a fixation with Kuroiso, who is Ai-chan's personal bodyguard, but the motivation behind it changes between the manga and the anime from one of admiration to one of romance. She currently dates him. She is also very fond of donuts.
She is known as Miss Agnes in the Vitello and Phuuz dubs.
She is known as Miss Polly in the Funimation dub, and is portrayed as a nymphomaniac.

He worked for a while as Futaba Kindergarten staff member. Age 21. He first appeared in an episode aired on August 26, 2005. He can literally be on fire at his own discretion, which is his key personality trait in the show. His name is a reflection of this as it is a wordplay on the expression "atsukurushii zo!" (暑苦しいぞ！), which means "It's sweltering!". He is a teacher in training for the Sunflower Class. At first, many of the students were taken aback and annoyed at his passionate way of teaching things but they grew to love him in the end.
He is known as The Flamer in the Funimation dub. He is the coach of recess and is a mutant who can light himself on fire at will. He aims to eliminate all normal humans, and claims to be part of a race known as "homo superior". He firmly believes in natural selection, and thinks gingers should be wiped out.

His Yakuza-like appearance is often misunderstood by the people in the neighborhood and even among the students and teachers of the kindergarten on some occasions, which often acts as a recurring joke in the series (often worsened by Shin-chan by calling him ). Actually he has a tender heart and a good attitude. He is shown to like women's wrestling in one episode. In an episode where the teachers are getting their medical checkup at kindergarten, it is shown that he has high blood pressure and it's because of stress. He said his stress is mainly due to the three teachers, as well as Shin-chan and his friends.
His name is based on actors Bunta Sugawara and Ken Takakura, both famous for their Yakuza roles in movies. Sugawara, Takakura, and Rokuro Naya (Encho's voice actor) all died within the same month in November 2014.
He is known as Principal Enzo in the Vitello and Phuuz dubs.
He is known as Principal Bernoulli Ench in the Funimation dub, and is portrayed as a half-Peruvian, half-gypsy man with a complicated past.  For example, he used to be a magician, but after killing multiple audience members during one of his magic acts, he was exiled from his home country.

She is Takakura's wife and the Futaba Kindergarten Vice Principal.

Kindergarten children's family

Nene-chan's mother. She gets easily angry by both Shin-chan and Misae, the latter of whom always seems to rub her the wrong way whenever they meet. Moeko expresses her anger by beating up a very large stuffed toy rabbit in a private place. Her psychologically-questionable behavior is sometimes noticed by others, and those who see her beating up a stuffed toy feel very intimidated. Her way of expressing anger has been passed down to her daughter, Nene-chan. She have constipation problem too, just like Misae.
She is known as Ruby in the Vitello and Phuuz dubs.
She is known as Patty Milfer in the Funimation dub. A recurring joke revolves around her repeatedly trying to run away and leave her abusive husband, and planning to work in a brothel to support herself afterwards. One episode of the dub revolved around her attempt to do this, but her plans were ruined by Shin. It is also stated that she had another child after Penny named Caitlin who she ended up drowning in a lake, which is also played as black comedy.
In the LUK Internacional dub she has a British accent.

Nene's father. He is considered to have a cool personality. He likes to go to cherry blossom festivals and often invites the Nohara family, much to his wife's chagrin. He only appeared few times in anime. 
He is named Bill Milfer in the Funimation dub, but never appears onscreen. In the dub, it is heavily implied that he is abusive towards Penny and her mother. However, in season 2, it is stated that he went to anger management class as the result of a DWI charge, and has since stopped being physically abusive.

Kazama-kun's mother. She has the appearance of a rich man's wife. She has her son Kazama-kun do many extracurricular activities such as football, cricket, tuitions etc. She also likes to try to make younger men swoon by her looks and fashion. Unlike Nene's mother, Kazama-kun's mother is not ruffled by Shin-chan easily. She is friends with Misae.
She is named Barbara Prescott in the Funimation dub. She is just as much of a big Republican as her son, and is sometimes implied to be racist.

He is a very good architect. Apparently richer than most of Shin-chan's friends' parents, he has traveled abroad several times, and is rarely at home because of it. He has a very easy going attitude and gets along fine with everyone including the Nohara family.
In the Funimation dub, he is stated to be an American diplomat.

Masao's mother, whose face looks almost identical to that of her son's.

He works in an office and is referred to as a boring person by Masao. His father said that before his marriage he was in a rock band.

She is mother of Bo. She has appeared only once in the manga, and has yet to appear in the anime. Shin-chan, Kazama-kun, Nene-chan, and Masao-kun have tried to imagine what she looked like.

Ai-chan's bodyguard and driver. He always wears a black business suit and sunglasses, akin to Secret service agents. He is very obedient to Ai-chan's orders because she blackmails him with disclosing the misdeeds he has done when he thought no one was watching (such as accidentally breaking one of her parents' priceless pieces of art and using super-glue to repair it) such as one time when Ai-chan ordered him to find leaves that have fallen during autumn (which result in him being hospitalized when he slipped while catching a beautiful leaf hanging on top of a tree branch). He has dated Miss Ageo, a Futaba kindergarten teacher. He hides while Ai-chan is in class (for example, in the top of the playfield's trees), but Shin-chan always finds his hiding place.
He is known as Mr. K in the Funimation dub.

Nanako's family and friends

The college girl with whom Shin-chan has a deep crush. She is 20 years old. The first time they met was when Shin-chan was strolling in the neighborhood and got something in his eye. Nanako took it out for him. Since then, they have kept in contact. Nanako is the only girl that is unruffled by Shin-chan's behavior, and the only one Shin-chan tries to behave for, even being shy and blushing around her. She dreams of being a kindergarten teacher. She first appeared on January 29, 1996. However, she just sees Shin-chan as a little brother. A notable running gag is that,  whenever Nanako offers to visit Shin Chan or spend time with him, he always misses spending time with her either due to Nanako's father, Nanako's college friend, Shin Chan's family members or friends and many times due to excessive sleep because of waking up so early to meet her and gets tired. Nanako briefly dates Yonro.
She is known as Miss Bono in the Vitello and Phuuz dubs.
In the Funimation dub, Shin refers to her as "Hottie Nanako".

Nanako's father. He is a famous author of many popular books. He is overprotective of his daughter and worries too much about her. He is often seen to disrupt any important matters at hand whenever he has the most extremely subtle (false) hint that Nanako may be in trouble. He disapproves of Shin-chan's love for his daughter though they both band together in keeping an eye on her.
In the Funimation dub, he is known as Will Cumton, and is re-imagined as a vampire who exclusively appears in the episode "True Twillight Diaries". Similar to most stereotypical vampires, he is afraid of garlic, silver, and sunlight. He is also said to be able to transform into a half-bat half-human form, which he can use to fly away. He went on a snowboarding trip with Nanako (who wasn't aware of his real identity) and intended to use her body to replace her soul with that of his deceased lover, Cookie. He was also responsible for Rex's "mysterious" death, who used to be Nanako's ex-boyfriend and a famous snow-boarder. His attempts to seduce Nanako were all foiled by Shin. He is voiced with a Cajun accent, and is stated to be from Louisiana, as well as being rather wealthy.

Nanako's 20 years old college friend. She hopes to become a professional wrestler. Her name is based on real-life wrestler Shinobu Kandori.
She is known as Griselda in the Funimation dub, and is stated to be Dutch.

Shijuurou's 32 year-old editor who works of Futaba Publishing (Mitsuba Publishing in the anime). He is based on a real editor who serves as the editor-in-chief of Manga Town, the magazine the Crayon Shin-chan manga is serialized in.
In the Funimation dub, he is known as Renfield and is re-imagined as Vampire Will's servant.

Saitama Crimson Scorpions

A gang of high school girls who run into Shin-chan often, with dire consequences. Their gang rivals are other girl gangs like the Osaka Motoyoshi Corps(大阪もとよし軍団) and Showa-machi Black Lizard(庄和町黒トカゲ団). Shin-chan firmly believes them to be an aspiring group of comedians.

Age: 17 (First appearance) - 18 (Current)

The 17-year-old Leader of the clique. She is a tough fighter and behaves righteously towards her friends. Her violent and brash behavior undermines her gentle and kind side, and despite being the leader of a female gang, shows a surprising amount of genial traits. Has a secret hobby of dressing up as a Sailor Moon character and does not want her teammates to know that she does not know how to use a cellphone, and is shown having difficulty sending an SMS through it. Fukazume is actually her nickname of sorts meaning "Rough 'n Ready". She is Nanako's best friend. She also has a crush on Shinnozuke's father, Hiroshi.

Member of the clique who always wears a mask with an "X" on it, thus earning her nickname "Fish-eyed Ogin" (the X resembles the eye of a dead fish). She is taciturn. She is also a good friend of Nanako. Despite her somewhat fearsome demeanor, she possesses a kind side, shown in an episode where she helps out her sick mother. Her face was revealed when Himawari playfully took off her mask.

Another member of the clique, who is fat and clumsy. She is a good friend of Nanako. She often helps her friends despite her inability to fight.

Family friends and acquaintances

Hiroshi's co-workers
Hiroshi Nohara works at a company called , located in Kasumigaseki, Tokyo (In the movie from Adventure in Henderland, it is located in Nihonbashi, Chuo, Tokyo). They sell computers. In the Funimation dub, the company is instead said to sell silverware.

Hiroshi is his good friend, so Kawaguchi always looks up to him almost to the point of him thinking that Hiroshi can do no wrong. They often go out to lunch together. His surname comes from Kawaguchi, Saitama. He is only referred to by his last name, and his first name is never given.
He is known as Morty in the Vitello and Phuuz dubs.

Hiroshi's boss and manager, his name is unknown.

Misae's and Hiroshi's friends

She's been Misae's good friend since middle school. Age 29. Her nickname is "Kei", so Shin-chan calls her "Okei-obasan" (Aunt(ie) Kei). She married Satoshi. Her running gag is that Shin-chan would make comment about how she tricked her younger husband into marrying her, making her feel really awkward.

Keiko's husband. Age 21. He loves anime and owns many Action Mask movies and action figures.
He is known as Jim in the Vitello and Phuuz dubs.

Keiko and Satoshi's baby son. His nickname is "Hito-kun". He is always smiling. In the manga version, he has grown a little and goes to swimming school. He is three months older than Himawari.

Fumie is Keiko's niece. She resembles Mimiko from Action Mask. Sometimes she babysits Shin-chan and Hitoshi.

Misae's old friend who is a manga artist.

Kasukabe residents

Nohara family's neighbor. She loves to gossip so she is frequently seen to be chatting with Misae. She also took in Shiro while the Nohara's had to move to the apartment. Her surname is after to Kitamoto, Saitama.
She is known as Goobers in the Vitello and Phuuz dubs.
She is known as Yuka in the Funimation dub. She almost constantly mentions she has fibromyalgia, and frequently references her children who never come to visit her.

Kitamoto's nephew. He lives mainly in the US, but sometimes he stays at her house. Shin-chan calls him "Beruto-kun." At first, he couldn't speak any Japanese at all so he would misunderstand everything and was naive to Japanese culture so he took everything Shin-chan would tell him about it at face value. He once had a crush on Nanako. He teaches English at an eikaiwa school. Even though he is half-Japanese, he carries the facial features the show almost always shows foreigners having – blonde haired, blue eyed, and a pointy nose.
In the Funimation dub, he is an albino French man with a sharp French accent sent to Yuka through couch surfing to keep her company. Kenta believes him to be "the albino titan, Beezledrop", and sent him to Afghanistan to open a portal. In season 3, he has returned to Kasukabe, but was apparently indoctrinated by terrorists during his time in Afghanistan.
In the LUK Internacional dub he is a Frenchman instead of an American.

The Nohara family's other neighbor, affectionately known as Yocchi. Yocchi and his wife Micchī meet Shin-chan's family for the first time on a trip to Hawaii. After the trip, they moved next door to Shin-chan's family. Their surnames are named after Hatogaya, Saitama. They display their affection towards one another as well as always having a very effervescent attitude, which contrasts with earlier Japanese generations. He and his wife are always wearing matching clothes and they are easily excited by new things. The pair were originally a one shot appearance with the same name and mannerisms, but with a completely different and mature look. Their re-introduction as semi-regular characters on the show saw a revamp in their appearance. They're mentioned as friendless, mostly coming to Noharas for arguing over silliest things or appear suddenly and invite themselves to supper, despite the hatred they often received from the Nohara's as well (mostly from Hiroshi).
In the Funimation dub, he and his wife are in constant debt due to their constant spending and need to have all the new things, and have adopted habits to run out on bills and look for sleazy, cheap buildings to live in. Yoshirin is stated to collect hentai, much to his wife's dismay, though later it is mentioned that he managed to get her interested in it as well.
He is known as Luis in the Vitello and Phuuz dubs.

Yoshirin's wife. She likes to watch horror movies (to her husband's chagrin) and collects stuffed dinosaurs. Whenever she and Yocchi have a fight (often over the silliest things), they both end going to the Nohara's for advice and often reconcile while the Nohara's fight (often due to Yocchi and Micchi's argument) by deciding they don't want to become like Hiroshi and Misae. They're also prone to appear suddenly at the Nohara's and invite themselves to supper. 
She is known as Gidgy in the Vitello and Phuuz dubs.

Motohisa (もとひさ)

He is a brat who's obsessed with western cowboy/ninja films. While being a child, he was inspired by the movie Rocky and Alain Delon. He throws around two friends and treats them as his 'subordinates.' He requested a duel against the new kid on the block after falling in love with Nene at first sight but is defeated. Specialty: chunnibyo so strong his words give you goosebumps.

His attempts to win Nene's heart always end in failure. He always challenges and fight with Shin-chan for Nene. Whoever wins get to be with Nene.

He appeared for the first time in ten years in the episode 661.

Matazuresou residents

The Nohara family had to temporarily move into an old apartment complex called , when their house was being reconstructed after a gas explosion that destroyed it completely. During this time, the Noharas became acquainted with most of the neighboring residents. The name literally translates to "It looks like it will fall apart again." A real apartment complex in Kobe was named Matazuresou since the owner was a big fan of this comic. The English Funimation dub uses the play-on-words "Falling Apartments".

She is the landowner. She has very strict rules such as being very quiet in the corridors and not allowing pets. She spends her free time piling her collection of dentures into a tower. Her cold attitude toward children can be attributed to the fact that her husband and her three-year-old daughter died in a traffic accident 30 years ago. Her name is a play on the Japanese words yanushi (家主) and ōya (大家), both of which mean "landlord".
In the Funimation dub, she is referred to as the Manlady by Shin, a pun on her homely appearance and position of power as landlady.

He lives next door from Shin-chan's family at room 201. He attended Tokyo Kasukabe University, not Tokyo University as Misae had mistakenly believed. Misae and Hiroshi frequently invited him over to fancy dinners at their house being very supportive of him so that one day when Yonro goes into a successful political career, he would thank them with money and gifts. When Misae and Hiroshi found out that he wasn't attending Tokyo University, they practically abandoned him. He has visited Shin-chan's family when they moved back into their old house. He works at a supermarket as a part-time job. His wall and the Nohara family's wall in the apartment have a huge big hole.
The Funimation dub pits Yonro as a stereotypical nerd obsessed with sci-fi and hentai. Shin-chan refers to him as "dropout" due to a running gag in the dub that he cannot pass the entrance exams for any of the Kasukabe community colleges. 

She is an 18-year-old mother. Her actions and style reflect the Japanese younger generation.
She is known as Summer in the Funimation dub. She is an American who moved to Japan trying to find the father of her daughter, whom she only knew from a one night stand. She is depicted as being an airhead with a "Valley Girl" accent.

Atsuko's two-year-old daughter. She usually dresses in the same fashions as her mother and is prone to nose picking.
She is known as Paris in the Funimation dub and is not a baby but a 7-year-old dwarf. She also refers to things that are bad or she dislikes as "ghetto".

Atsuko's husband, he is a truck driver. He doesn't appear in the anime.

An undercover police officer who works with Kyousuke on a narcotics control case. He and Kyousuke are renting room 204 in the anime and 205 in the manga, although he does not actually live there. He and Kyousuke have gone to Shin-chan's kindergarten to teach the children street smarts. He and his partner pose as father and son so as not to draw suspicion.
He is known as Barnie Ota in the Funimation dub. Instead of posing as father and son, he and his partner pose as a gay couple. Though this is used as a cover, it is implied Ota has feelings for his partner, who is oblivious to this.

An undercover police officer who works with Kyuji.
He is known as Ken Nakatomi in the Funimation dub.

The resident of 203 who wants to be an actress. Constantly wears bizarre costumes in order to practice for auditions. One time, she confused the Nohara family by portraying herself as an abusive man and an attractive woman before they found out her true identity.

TV stars and fictional characters

Age: 400+

Buriburizaemon is a cowardly talking pig who is featured in some of the episodes and chapters set in ancient Japan. Despite being a product of Shin-chan's imagination, he is treated as an actual character. Buriburizaemon's major appearances in the anime were initially limited due to the death of his original voice actor in 2000, but he made a few cameos after that. Buriburizaemon did not have a speaking part until 2010 when he appears in the alternate reality "SHIN-MEN" episodes as a group of 5 evil clones called "TON-MEN". On May 13, 2016 he returned permanently with a new voice actor, Hiroshi Kamiya, from episode 894-2 "The Adventures of Buriburizaemon: The Revival Chapter" (ぶりぶりざえもんの冒険 覚醒編) on. He appears as a major character in the TV special "Crayon Wars", a parody of Star Wars.
He is known as Big-a-zoid in the Vitello and Phuuz dubs.
He is known as Brave Pig in the LUK Internacional dub. In some episodes, he is known for changing his names like French Interpol detective, Jean Pierre Andre Joseph de Chateaubriand, Italian Interpol detective, Alessandro Francesco De Nicola and Leonardo DiPorkio.
He only has one major appearance in the Funimation dub, appearing in the dubbed version of the "Crayon Wars" special (retitled "Shin Wars"). In the episode, he is referred to as Ham Solo, though this name was later used for non-Star Wars based cameo appearances in later episodes.

Action Mask TV series

Action Mask is a spoof of Japan's tokusatsu shows (most notably, the Kamen Rider Series' shows). Action Mask finishes his enemies off with a beam attack known as the "Action Beam". His episodes are shown as a show within a show. In the theatrical movie, his origin is changed, instead of coming from the "Action Planet", he is stated to have been rescued from a fatal accident by Professor Kitakasukabe and given superpowers using advanced technology.
In 2014, a spin-off manga series based on Action Mask was published in Monthly Action Magazine from Futabasha. It's available on Crunchyroll outside Japan.
He is known as Masked Muchacho in the Vitello and Phuuz dubs.
He is known as Action Bastard in the Funimation dub.

Action Mask's alter ego. When not engaged in saving the world, he is a movie stuntman.
In the spin-off manga, Gō takes an undercover mission in Saitama to investigate a series of incidents in which humans are implanted with "seeds" that turn them into monsters through hatred. He transforms into Action Mask to combat the monsters. However instead of attacking the monsters with violence, Action Mask instead tries to reason with them and have the monsters express their feelings, relieving their hatred. This allows the seed of the monster to be exposed allowing Action Mask to use his Action Beam to free the seed from its host.
He is known as Bruce Bastard in the Funimation dub. It is stated that Doc found him as a baby in a spaceship after his parents were killed by a mugger,  and was bitten by a radioactive bastard on an Indian burial ground, parodying the origins of several western superheroes including Superman, Batman, and Spider-Man.

Action Mask's young sidekick. She provides Action Mask with weapons and information, though she more often than not gets herself captured in the process.
In the spin-off manga, Mimiko is an adult working as Dr. Kitakasukabe's assistant, monitoring Gō's progress.
She is known as Loli Pop in the Funimation dub. In episode 41, Loli gains new powers that parody the magical girl genre, renaming herself Jailbait Poon. Her name is a pun on the word lolicon.

The inventor of Action Mask's weapons and vehicles to fight evil. In the spinoff manga and theatrical movie, he is instead replaced by a similar character named . 
He is known simply as Doc in the Funimation dub, and it is stated that he was the one who found an orphaned Action Bastard as a baby.

He's an advanced intelligent robot with his own equivalent of Action Mask's techniques. He also has two weaker versions of himself called MekeMeke X and MekeMeke Y.

The first of the Black MekeMeke Group's . She is a woman wearing a heart-shaped head covering and a cape.

The second of the "Black Four Heavenly Kings". He is a chimpanzee with a long white beard who dons an admiral's uniform. He is one of the villains who has been defeated the most by Action Mask, and has a son named Yankikki.

The third of the "Black Four Heavenly Kings". He is an insect-like humanoid resembling a praying mantis.

The fourth and final member of the "Black Four Heavenly Kings". He is a humanoid iguana who wields a sword.

The leader of the  whom Action Mask encounters during the "Action Mask Fever" story arc. In reality, he is Mimiko's missing older brother, who was brainwashed by Tsubainbach. His outfit and name are likely based on the anime Gatchaman and its protagonist Ken the Eagle.
He is known as Flying Pecker in the Funimation dub. He appears in the Lucky Bastard Fever serial, and turned out to be a brainwashed man named Phillippe who was in an arranged marriage with Loli Pop.

The mastermind behind the Sparrow Group and the true villain of the "Action Mask Fever" story arc. He is a genius mad scientist who was an acquaintance of Professor Gō during their time in school together.
In the Funimation dub, he is known as Doctor Hitlerclone due to his resemblance to Adolf Hitler, and is voiced with a German accent.

A villain with mysterious motivations who is characterized by his chivalrous attitude towards women, notably with Mimiko. He is portrayed by a very handsome actor, which leads to Misae and Himawari both being attracted to him and wanting to watch Action Mask whenever he appears in an episode.
In the Funimation dub, he is known as the Deflowerer.
Misato Yashio
Appearing only in the spin-off manga, Misato first encountered Gō when he transforms into Action Mask to save her from a monster who has a hatred for children. She is surprised to see Action Mask not fighting back against the monster and instead tries to reason with it. Misato is a fan of tokusatsu (her favorite being Twin Leaf Mask) and dresses as boy when attending school. 
Bal
Appearing only in the spin-off manga. Bal is a ghostly entity who assists Gō in both transforming into Action Mask and exposing the monsters' seeds.

Kantam Robo Anime Series

Shin-chan's favorite anime character. Kantam Robo parodies the mecha anime genre. Additionally, the main robot can transform into two forms. His main attack is the "Kantam Punch". Like Action Mask, his adventures are shown within a Shin-chan episode.
He is known as Psycho Robotico in the Vitello and Phuuz dubs.
He is known as Robo Grinder in the Funimation dub.

Kantam's human partner. He helps the smaller Kantam pilot the main robot.  He is also necessary for Kantam to change form.

The main antagonist of the anime and the leader of the Midnight Secret Society (秘密結社ミッドナイト).

Kantam's older brother and rival working for President Gilkilos and Midnight.

SHIN-MEN Characters
SHIN-MEN is Crayon Shin-chan's take on the five person tokusatsu programs like the Super Sentai Series with five members that all look like Shin-Chan fighting the evil TON-MEN (who all look like Buriburizaemon) in an alternate reality signified by a markedly different style of animation.

This character's personality is closest to the "real world" Shin-Chan. He thinks crime fighting is boring and is lazy in general, but when a young lady is involved, he will fight with all of his heart as well as do mundane tasks with speed and efficiency in order to impress her.  As his name implies, he commands the element of fire.

Probably the most heroic of the SHIN-MEN and the leader of the group. He's a stand-up, no nonsense boy who commands the power of wind. This allows him free flight. He's in love with Iron Can.

Another heroic SHIN-MEN whose iron body can configure itself into different vehicles. She chooses toughness over finesse and therefore usually rushes into a situation without thinking. She's the only girl in the group, and has two identical sisters. She's in love with Wind Hyuu.

This member is a bit of a joker and has an eye for the ladies like Gou, but doesn't use them as an ulterior motive for fighting. He can use and control water as a weapon as long as he is hydrated. When he doesn't get enough water, he shrinks down.

This member can use and spawn plants in battle, but like Sui, his powers are dependent upon water. A lack of water causes him to shrivel up and become ineffectual.

This reality's iteration of Hiroshi except that he's a single man and owner of a ramen shop. He takes care of Gou, however, because he is too lazy to take care of himself.

Other characters

The eponymous main character of a fictional TV show parodying the magical girl genre. Her first appearance was in episode 335 and the last one being in episode 348. After this, Mari was only shown in cameos, the last one being in episode 540 as a figure in Kazama's room along with other figures, including one of Moe-P. The series' main song is I'll cast a spell (魔法をかけてあげる). Toru Kazama is an obsessed fan of Mari-chan, but will not admit it because of shame as the series is aimed at a female audience.
She is known as Mary, the Mysterious Magician in the LUK Internacional dub

A moe-driven magical girl parody. Kazama-kun has a secret obsession with the character.
She is known as Yaz Heiressz in the Funimation dub. She is supposedly rich from her dead father's inheritance, spreading the message "Money makes life happy!" to girls everywhere.

A fictional monster that Shin-chan owns a toy of. He is a parody of Godzilla, and has a noticeable bare buttocks. His name is a play on the Japanese phrase "shiri marudashi" (尻丸出し), meaning "bare buttocks".
He is known as Bare-Ass Godzilla in the Funimation dub.

A college student who has held many part-time jobs to put herself through college, only to lose them often due to Shin-chan's antics. She absolutely despises him, but due to her frequent jobs involving customer service, she has to put up with him. She finally takes up a job in the lost child department of the Action Departmental Store.

Shin-chan's 34-year-old Kendo Master. He first appeared in the April 26, 2003 episode  to teach Shin-chan the ways of Kendo. Has a habit of always stepping into dog feces whenever he walks away.
In the Funimation dub, he is a paranoid schizophrenic whom suffers from strange, misogynistic delusions, and believes in his own ridiculous prophecy that Shin is "Dildor", a fabled hero who is destined to destroy "Sluteris, the Fly Lord's evil mistress". In season 3, it's said that he is dead after joining Robert in Afghanistan.

A newscaster whose show Misae often watches. His name comes from Dan Rather.
He is known as Sam Donarshin in the Vitello and Phuuz dubs.

A famous manga artist who lives in the same neighborhood as Shin-chan. He often gets ideas from Shin-chan. Masao-kun is a huge fan of his. His name comes from series creator Yoshito Usui.
He is known as Marty Flang in the Vitello and Phuuz dubs.

The creator of the Crayon Shin-Chan manga who sometimes makes cameo appearances in the movies and the TV show. In the feature length movies, his character is young looking, effervescent, and dresses up in gaudy suits while singing karaoke. He is either seen practicing for a karaoke event or is asking directions to get to a karaoke event. His cameos always lead to him being punched in the face by Hiroshi or Misae.

Kuriyo Urima is a 29 year old saleslady from Sendai who appeared for the first time in episode 48b. She came to Kasukabe as part of her job. She is mistaken for cross-dresser by Shinnosuke. This woman is a door-to-door saleswoman for a company that makes books and audio cassette tapes for young children. Unfortunately for this "woman", her appearance tends to scare the hell out of young children which means that her sales are pitiful. Everyone misunderstands her as a terrorist and many times she was incarcerated as faced to the consequences by Shin chan.Shin-chan is also firmly convinced that this woman is actually a man. Everyone treats her as a Man after that. However, this hasn't deterred her and she has gone to the mountains for rigorous training in the secret arts of the travelling saleswomen. Still, her habit of blowing a kiss sends a chill down Shin-chan's spine.. even when she's halfway across town.

A stuffed rabbit, owned by Nene and her mother. Nene and her mother started using it as a punching bag to vent out their anger. 
It is known as Happiness Bunny in the Funimation dub. There are three occurrences in the Funimation dub where it came to life at the light of a lunar eclipse (evidenced by a red moon), and takes revenge on Penny and her mother for all the beatings.

A strange girl from the future with the same facial features as Shin-chan. She has a slightly creepy demeanor, but is the opposite of Shin-chan in many ways as she is tactful, empathetic, and sees the good qualities in the people she meets. Her family is still not revealed but she has a bodyguard. Some fans said she is the future Himawari while some said she is Shinchan and his fiancée Tamiko's daughter

References

Crayon Shin-chan
Crayon Shin-chan
Crayon Shin-chan